Dizzy Panic is a puzzle video game published in 1990 by Codemasters for the Amstrad CPC, ZX Spectrum, Commodore 64, Master System and the Game Gear. The game is based on the Dizzy series and was designed by the Oliver Twins but was developed by Big Red Software.

Gameplay involves moving a wall left and right so that falling shapes pass through the appropriately shaped holes in the wall.

The game was included as part of The Excellent Dizzy Collection in 1993.

References

External links 

1990 video games
Dizzy (series)
Codemasters games
Amstrad CPC games
ZX Spectrum games
Commodore 64 games
Master System games
Game Gear games
Video games scored by Allister Brimble
Video games developed in the United Kingdom
Big Red Software games
Single-player video games